Sourou is one of the 45 provinces of Burkina Faso, located in its Boucle du Mouhoun.

Its capital is Tougan.

Education
In 2011 the province had 162 primary schools and 17 secondary schools.

Healthcare
In 2011 the province had 27 health and social promotion centers (Centres de santé et de promotion sociale), 5 doctors and 89 nurses.

Departments
Sourou is divided into 8 departments:
Di
Gomboro
Kassoum
Kiembara
Lanfiera
Lankoue
Toeni
Tougan

See also
Regions of Burkina Faso
Provinces of Burkina Faso
Departments of Burkina Faso

References

 
Provinces of Burkina Faso